This is a list of University of Wollongong people including notable alumni and staff.

Administration

Chancellors
The Chancellor of the University of Wollongong serves as the nominal head of the university. As with most other university chancellors, the role is now largely ceremonial.

 1975-1996 Robert Marsden Hope
 1997-2009 Mike Codd
 2009–present  Jillian Broadbent

Vice Chancellors
The Vice-Chancellor of the University of Wollongong serves as the chief executive officer of the university, and oversees most of the university's day-to-day operations.

 1975-1980 Michael Birt
 1981-1994 Ken McKinnon
 1995-2011 Gerald Sutton
 2012–present Paul Wellings

Staff

 Noel Cressie - Distinguished Professor of Spatial Statistics 
 Beverly Derewianka - Emeritus Professor of linguistics
 Andrew Ford - English-born Australian composer, writer and radio presenter
 Kristine French – plant biologist and conservationist 
 Richard Harland - author
 Christian Heim – composer, psychiatrist
 Rob Hood - author
Natalie Matosin, National Health and Medical Research Council CJ Martin Early Career Research Fellow
 Cecilia Nembou, educator, women's rights activist, and first female vice-chancellor for a university in Papua New Guinea
 Sharon Robinson — Antarctic researcher and plant physiologist
 Willy Susilo - cryptographer, IEEE Fellow
 Gordon Wallace - electromaterials scientist
 Alan Wearne - poet

Alumni
In 2012, in a survey of over 5,000 employers, the QS World University Rankings placed UOW at 99th in the world for graduate employability. As of 2014, the University has turned out more than a hundred thousand graduates, and also has members all over the world in 143 countries. Although a large number of alumni live in Wollongong and Sydney, and a significant number also live in Melbourne, Brisbane, Canberra, Singapore, Kuala Lumpur, Hong Kong, London, New York and Washington, D.C.

 Estelle Asmodelle - transgender model, writer and activist
 Van Badham - writer
 Glenn Barkley - director, Museum of Contemporary Art, Sydney
 Kate Bell - actor, Blue Water High
 Clare Bowen - actor, Nashville (2012 TV series)
 Mez Breeze - new media artist
 Matt Brown - politician, academic and solicitor
 Michael Byrne - poet
 Jay Caselberg - author
 Ben Creagh - rugby league player for the St. George Illawarra Dragons NRL team
 Mark Cutifani - CEO, AngloAmerican
 Cromok - Malaysian thrash metal band
 Stef Dawson - actress, The Hunger Games
 Bryan Doyle MP - NSW State Member for Campbelltown
 Lee Furlong - television presenter; Fox Sports news reader; wife of Australian cricketer Shane Watson
 Nita Green - Labor Senator for Queensland
 Zaiping Guo - Professor and materials engineer
 David Hurley - Former Australian Chief of Defence Force, Governor of New South Wales
 Stephen Jones - Member of the Australian Parliament
 "Dr Karl" Kruszelnicki - scientist, author and commentator
 Stephen Martin - former Federal Parliamentary Speaker
 George McHugh - Big 4 auditor
 Julian McMahon - actor; son of former Australian Prime Minister Sir William McMahon
 Clinton Mead - Mayor of Campbelltown City Council
 Josh Morris- rugby league player for the Bulldogs NRL team
 Bill Neskovski - playwright
 Jamie Peacock - England and Great Britain rugby league captain
 Netatua Pelesikoti - Tongan environmental scientist
 Wendy Richardson - playwright
 B. Sandhya -  Additional Director General of Police of Kerala state in India and an author
 Thomas Spohr – solicitor and prosecutor
 Roger Summons - Professor of Geobiology, Massachusetts Institute of Technology
 Kumi Taguchi - Australian Broadcasting Corporation newsreader
 Melanie Tait - writer & broadcaster
 Victoria Thaine - actor, Caterpillar Wish
 John Tranter - poet
 Bundit Ungrangsee - orchestral conductor
 Julienne van Loon - novelist
 Gareth Ward - local councillor on Shoalhaven City Council; Graduate Member of University Council; politician
 Graham West - Vice President, St Vincent De Pauls
 Alex Zelinsky - Chief Defence Scientist of Australia; co-founder Seeing Machines Limited; serves on UOW Council

Yutaka Izumihara- actor、Stunt Man、 Acting Coach、Producer

See also
 University of Wollongong alumni
 University of Wollongong faculty

References

External links
 UOW Alumni
 UOW Alumni Magazine

People
Wollongong
University of Wollongong